The Bering flounder (Hippoglossoides robustus) is a flatfish of the family Pleuronectidae. Its native habitat is the northern Pacific, from Japan and the Sea of Okhotsk across the Bering Sea to Alaska, the Aleutian Islands and Canada's Arctic coast.

References

Bering flounder
Fish of the Arctic Ocean
Fish of the Bering Sea
Fish of the North Pacific
Bering flounder
Taxa named by Theodore Gill